Pachliopta antiphus is a species of butterfly from the family Papilionidae (swallowtails) that is found in Sumatra, Borneo and the Philippines.

The larvae feed on Aristolochia.

Taxonomy 
The taxonomic position of P. a. antiphus is uncertain. It is regarded as conspecific with Pachliopta aristolochiae by Tsukada and Nishiyama (1982) and Fujioka et al. but recognized as a separate species by Page & Treadaway (1995).

Subspecies 
 P. a. antiphus
 P. a. acuta (Druce, 1873) – Philippines: Jolo, Mapun, Tawitawi, Sanga Sanga, Sibutu, Basilan
 P. a. brevicauda (Staudinger, 1889) – Philippines: Busuanga, Cuyo, Dumaran, Palawan
 P. a. elioti (Page & Treadaway, 1995) – Philippines: Siasi

The following subspecies are treated as junior synonyms of Pachliopta antiphus antiphus by Page & Treadaway (1995):
 Papilio aristolochiae poseidippus Fruhstorfer, 1911
 Papilio aristolochiae kameiros Fruhstorfer, 1911

References 

 Tsukada, E. & Nishiyama, Y. 1982. Papilionidae. In: Tsukada, E. (ed): Butterflies of the South East Asian Islands. Volume 1. Plapac Co., Tokyo
 Fujioka, T., Tsukiyama, H. & Chiba, H. 1997. Japanese Butterflies and their Relatives in the World I. [Japan]. 3 volumes, 301 pp., 196 pp., 162 pls.
 Page M. G.P & Treadaway,C. G.  2003 Schmetterlinge der Erde, Butterflies of the World Part XVII (17), Papilionidae IX Papilionidae of the Philippine Islands. Edited by Erich Bauer and  Thomas Frankenbach  Keltern: Goecke & Evers; Canterbury: Hillside Books.

External links 
 
 
 External images

Pachliopta
Atrophaneura
Butterflies described in 1793
Butterflies of Borneo